Ŏp'a station is a railway station in Ŏp'a-rodongjagu, P'yŏngwŏn County, South P'yŏngan Province, North Korea. It is on located on the P'yŏngŭi line of the Korean State Railway.

History
The station was opened on 5 November 1905 along with the rest of this section of the Kyŏngŭi Line, from which the P'yŏngŭi Line was formed after the division of Korea in 1945. A pro-independence demonstration against the Japanese occupation of Korea of about a thousand people took place in front of the station on 7 March 1919.

References

Railway stations in North Korea